Joseph Bernard (December 12, 1923 – April 3, 2006) was an American actor and acting teacher who appeared in 25 Broadway plays and several movies and TV appearances in the 1950s through 1970s.

Bernard was born in Brooklyn, New York, and studied at New York's New School for Social Research with acting teacher Stella Adler. One of his New School classmates was Marlon Brando.

Bernard was drafted into the U.S. Army and served in the D-Day invasion of France. After the war, he appeared in the play Winter Soldiers and then Skipper Next to God, directed by Lee Strasberg and starring John Garfield, with whom he became friends. Garfield was Bernard's best man at his marriage to his wife, Bina, whom he wed in 1952. Bina died in 2001.

Bernard appeared in Murder, Inc., the Stanley Kramer film Judgment at Nuremberg (1961), in which he played an assistant to the American prosecutor, played by Richard Widmark, and a number of other films that included Ice Station Zebra. His television roles included appearances on Star Trek, The Twilight Zone (in the 1961 episode The Shelter), and Mission: Impossible.

In 1968, he became an executive director and teacher at the Lee Strasberg Theater Institute in Hollywood. He moved to Las Vegas in 1979 and established the Joseph Bernard Acting Studio.

In addition to directing episodes of The Flying Nun TV series, Joseph wrote both stage plays and screenplays.  His original theater production Take Off Your Clothes, I'll Make You A Star, based on his experiences as an acting teacher, had runs in both Los Angeles and Las Vegas.  Bernard and his son, writer/producer Sam Bernard, collaborated on the screenplay for the feature film Payback (1995) for Trimark Pictures.

Filmography

References

External links

Joseph Bernard (Aveleyman)

1923 births
2006 deaths
American male film actors
United States Army personnel of World War II
American male stage actors
American male television actors
Male actors from New York City
Military personnel from New York City
United States Army soldiers
20th-century American male actors